Starbomb is an American musical-comedy group composed of Dan Avidan and Brian Wecht of musical-comedy duo Ninja Sex Party together with Flash animator and Internet personality Arin Hanson and "space rock masters" TWRP, a Canadian music group known for collaborations with NSP. The songs of Starbomb consist of video game parodies; Avidan provides sung vocals, Hanson provides rapping vocals, and Wecht performs instruments. All three are also known as a part of YouTube Let's Play web series Game Grumps.

The group has released three studio albums, Starbomb (2013), Player Select (2014), and The TryForce (2019). Starbomb has also released several music videos, which occasionally feature known Internet, film, and video game fandom personalities such as Markiplier and Ashly Burch. Although the project was not announced until 2013, Hanson stated that the band had actually been formed "way before", without specifying when.

History

Formation and Starbomb (2013)

In summer 2013, Avidan began making comments about creating a new music project with Wecht and Hanson. The project wasn't officially announced until December 2, 2013, when the group released a preview of their song "I Choose You to Die" on Ninja Sex Party's official YouTube channel. They also announced that their first album, the self-titled Starbomb, would be released only two weeks later on December 17, 2013. Leading up to the album's launch date, the group released further previews on the Ninja Sex Party and Game Grumps YouTube channels, the latter of which was hosted by Avidan and Hanson.

In the weeks following its release, Starbomb placed on multiple Billboard charts, reaching #1 on Comedy Albums and Heatseekers Albums. Music videos for several of the album's songs such as "Luigi's Ballad" (in which Rachel Bloom voiced Princess Peach) and "It's Dangerous to Go Alone" were released to YouTube that same year and in spring of the following year. Destructoid commented on the album's release, stating that "While the concept itself may seem a bit juvenile, the awesome music (provided by Ninja Sex Party) and hilarious situations are more than enough to keep the more "mature" fan entertained."

Player Select (2014)

Starbomb's final song, "Outro," hinted at a future album. However, no official confirmation of a second album was forthcoming until fall of the following year. On December 16, 2014, Starbomb's second album, Player Select, was released. Like its predecessor, snippets of the album's songs were released on YouTube prior to its release. Additionally, Player Select placed on several Billboard charts, and achieved #1 on Comedy Albums. Player Select also charted on position #3 on Billboard's end of year charts for US Comedy Albums. AllMusic gave the album an overall favorable review, remarking that "Plenty of swearing and 8-bit innuendo make this for the adult retro gamer and not the kids, but the laughs are plentiful and big."

The TryForce (2015–2019)
In the video for "The Simple Plot of Metal Gear Solid", released on December 25, 2015, Hanson indicated there would be a third album.

On March 31, 2017, it was announced Hanson would join Ninja Sex Party for the Rock Hard 2017 tour, performing as Starbomb. However, on July 5, 2017, Hanson announced that he would not make the remainder of the Rock Hard Tour dates.

On November 7, 2017, the official Instagram for the band posted images of Hanson and Wecht working on a new project, with the caption, "Interesting things are happening...". On November 15, 2017, a third album was teased again, with the Starbomb Twitter account posting "hey @tomhanks do u want to do a guest verse on our next album, this is a serious offer" which never received an official response.

On a November 28, 2017 episode of Game Grumps, Avidan and Hanson confirmed that they had finished recording the third Starbomb album in El Paso, Texas. The writing and recording process was very different from previous albums, as the trio challenged themselves by spending only one day writing and recording each song; they also mentioned a tentative release date of December 2018. Tupper Ware Remix Party, Ninja Sex Party's frequent recording and touring partner band, will be featured on the album. On a July 29, 2018 episode of Game Grumps, Hanson and Avidan announced that the title of the upcoming album was The TryForce, "as in, we're trying our best! We're a force that tries", with a planned December 2018 release. On August 19, 2018, Ninja Sex Party mentioned in a Facebook post that The TryForce would be produced by Jim Roach, who had produced their album Cool Patrol; Wecht had acted as producer on previous Starbomb albums.

Regarding the songwriting process, Hanson stated in July 2018 that the third album was an equal effort between the three members, in opposition to previous albums in which he felt that Avidan and Wecht were responsible for most of the songwriting. He stated "my footprint on the first two albums wasn't super huge. It was... Ninja Sex Party does video game songs, featuring Egoraptor, you know, whereas the third Starbomb album really feels like we all wrote it together." Later the same month, Avidan agreed that the new album would be more of a team effort in a video.

On December 23, 2018, the official Starbomb Twitter account released an image that was presumed to be a small portion of the album cover for The TryForce. Over the course of the next few months, they also released several more portions of the image.

On January 8, 2019, in a Game Grumps video titled "2019 Game Grumps Updates + More!", Avidan and Hanson stated that The TryForce would be due for a late March 2019 release. On February 4, 2019, Starbomb announced in a new animated music video (for their first album's "Regretroid") that the album would instead be released on April 19, 2019. On March 29, 2019, a Game Grumps video titled "NEW STARBOMB ALBUM (2019)" confirmed that pre-orders for The TryForce would be available April 5, 2019.

On April 5, 2019, a music video for "Blowing the Payload", Starbomb's first original song since 2014, was released on Egoraptor's YouTube channel, titled, "Overwatch RAP". On April 12, 2019, another new video, for the song, "A Boy and His Boat", titled, "BEST Zelda Rap IN THE WORLD!!!" was uploaded to the same channel. On April 19, 2019, the album's release date, a music video for "Welcome to the Mario Party" was uploaded to the channel, titled, "SICKEST Mario Party RAP!!".

On April 19, 2019, the album was released, along with several new merchandise items.

Upcoming fourth studio album (2023–present)
In a tweet on February 27, 2023, Starbomb announced that a fourth album was in development.

Discography

Studio albums

Members
Band members
 Dan Avidan – lead and backing vocals, rapping (20132021)
 Arin Hanson – rapping, backing and lead  vocals, production (20132021)
 Brian Wecht – keyboards, programming, production (20132021)

Session and touring musicians
 Tupper Ware Remix Party – backup band, opening act (2015–2021)
 Lord Phobos – guitar
 Commander Meouch – bass guitar, backing vocals
 Doctor Sung – keytar, synthesizer, modified vocals
 Havve Hogan – drums

Commercial performance

Year-end charts

References

American comedy musical groups
Nerdcore artists
American synth-pop groups
Musical groups established in 2013
Ninja Sex Party
Musical groups disestablished in 2021
2013 establishments in California